Psiloteredo is a genus of ship-worms, marine bivalve molluscs of the family Teredinidae.

Species in the genus Psiloteredo 

 Psiloteredo healdi (Bartsch, 1931) 
 Psiloteredo megotara  (Hanley in Forbes & Hanley, 1848)
 Psiloteredo senegalensis  (Blainville, 1824)

References 

Molluscs described in 1922
Teredinidae
Bivalve genera